Socialism in one country was a Soviet state policy to strengthen socialism within the country rather than socialism globally. Given the defeats of the 1917–1923 European communist revolutions, Joseph Stalin and Nikolai Bukharin encouraged the theory of the possibility of constructing socialism in the Soviet Union. The theory was eventually adopted as Soviet state policy.

As a political theory, its proponents argue that it contradicts neither world revolution nor world communism. The theory opposes Leon Trotsky's theory of permanent revolution and the communist left's theory of world revolution.

Background 

The defeat of several proletarian revolutions in countries like Germany and Hungary ended Bolsheviks' hopes for an imminent world revolution and began promotion of socialism in one country by Joseph Stalin. In the first edition of The Foundations of Leninism (1924), Stalin was still a follower of the orthodox Marxist idea that revolution in one country is insufficient. Vladimir Lenin died in January 1924 and by the end of that year in the second edition of the book Stalin's position started to turn around as he claimed that "the proletariat can and must build the socialist society in one country". 

In April 1925, Nikolai Bukharin elaborated the issue in his brochure Can We Build Socialism in One Country in the Absence of the Victory of the West-European Proletariat? and the Soviet Union adopted socialism in one country as state policy after Stalin's January 1926 article On the Issues of Leninism. 1925–1926 signaled a shift in the immediate activity of the Communist International from world revolution towards a defense of the Soviet state. This period was known up to 1928 as the Second Period, mirroring the shift in the Soviet Union from war communism to the New Economic Policy.

In his 1915 article On the Slogan for a United States of Europe, Lenin had written: Uneven economic and political development is an absolute law of capitalism. Hence, the victory of socialism is possible first in several or even in one capitalist country alone. After expropriating the capitalists and organising their own socialist production, the victorious proletariat of that country will arise against the rest of the world.
	
In January 1918, Lenin wrote: I know that there are, of course, sages who think they are very clever and even call themselves Socialists, who assert that power should not have been seized until the revolution had broken out in all countries. They do not suspect that by speaking in this way they are deserting the revolution and going over to the side of the bourgeoisie. To wait until the toiling classes bring about a revolution on an international scale means that everybody should stand stock-still in expectation. That is nonsense.

After Lenin's death, Stalin used this quote, and others, to argue that Lenin shared his view of socialism in one country. Grigory Zinoviev and Leon Trotsky vigorously criticized the theory of socialism in one country. In particular, Trotskyists often claimed and still claim that socialism in one country opposes both the basic tenets of Marxism and Lenin's particular beliefs that the final success of socialism in one country depends upon the revolution's degree of success in proletarian revolutions in the more advanced countries of Western Europe. At the Seventh Congress in March 1918, Lenin explained: Regarded from the world-historical point of view, there would doubtlessly be no hope of the ultimate victory of our revolution if it were to remain alone, if there were no revolutionary movements in other countries. [...] I repeat, our salvation from all these difficulties is an all Europe revolution. [...] At all events, under all conceivable circumstances, if the German revolution does not come, we are doomed.

The exponents of socialism in one country contend that Stalin's theory was firmly in line with the basic tenets of Leninism in that the victory of socialism is possible in one or separate countries while other countries may continue to remain bourgeois for some time. To support this assertion, they quote Lenin, who said: [S]ocialism cannot achieve victory simultaneously in all countries. It will achieve victory first in one or several countries, while the others will for some time remain bourgeois or pre-bourgeois.

The defeat of all the 1917–1923 revolutions in Europe, except Russia, ended the Bolsheviks and especially Lenin's hopes for an imminent world revolution. In his 1918 Letter to American Workers, Lenin wrote: We are banking on the inevitability of the world revolution, but this does not mean that we are such fools as to bank on the revolution inevitably coming on a definite and early date.

In his report to the Extraordinary Seventh Congress of the R.C.P.(B.) which met on 6 March 1918, Lenin said: Yes, we shall see the world revolution, but for the time being it is a very good fairy-tale, a very beautiful fairy-tale—I quite understand children liking beautiful fairy-tales. But I ask, is it proper for a serious revolutionary to believe in fairy-tales? There is an element of reality in every fairy-tale. If you told children fairy-tales in which the cock and the cat did not converse in human language they would not be interested. In the same way, if you tell the people that civil war will break out in Germany and also guarantee that instead of a clash with imperialism we shall have a field revolution on a world-wide scale, the people will say you are deceiving them. In doing this you will be overcoming the difficulties with which history has confronted us only in your own minds, by your own wishes. It will be a good thing if the German proletariat is able to take action. But have you measured it, have you discovered an instrument that will show that the German revolution will break out on such-and-such a day? [...] If the revolution breaks out, everything is saved. Of course! But if it does not turn out as we desire, if it does not achieve victory tomorrow—what then? Then the masses will say to you, you acted like gamblers—you staked everything on a fortunate turn of events that did not take place, you proved to be unequal to the situation that actually arose instead of the world revolution, which will inevitably come, but which has not yet reached maturity.

With the world revolution having altogether failed to materialize, the nascent Soviet Union found itself encircled by capitalist or pre-capitalist states. According to the interpretation of Lenin's writings by the proponents of socialism in one country, Lenin laid down a long-term future course of action for the nascent Soviet state and its vanguard the R.C.P.(B.), enabling the young Soviet state needs to first start strengthening itself internally to survive. The plan was firstly based on building a close class alliance between the proletariat and the vast masses of the small peasantry (with assured proletarian leadership of the peasantry) and secondly constructing a complete socialist society in Russia whilst patiently awaiting and aiding the worldwide class struggle to first mature around the world before a mass based proletarian revolution on a worldwide scale is made possible. In his 1923 article titled Our Revolution, Lenin wrote: You say that civilization is necessary for the building of socialism. Very good. But why could we not first create such prerequisites of civilization in our country by the expulsion of the landowners and the Russian capitalists, and then start moving toward socialism? Where, in what books, have you read that such [...] sequence of events are impermissible or impossible?

Another quote by Lenin further expounded on his ideas in his article titled On Cooperation, where he wrote: Indeed, the power of the state over all large-scale means of production, political power in the hands of the proletariat, the alliance of this proletariat with the many millions of small and very small peasants, the assured proletarian leadership of the peasantry, etc. — is this not all that is necessary to build a complete socialist society out of cooperatives, out of cooperatives alone, which we formerly ridiculed as huckstering and which from a certain aspect we have the right to treat as such now, under NEP? Is this not all that is necessary to build a complete socialist society? It is still not the building of socialist society, but it is all that is necessary and sufficient for it.

Opponents of this interpretation, notably Leon Trotsky, have contended that the Lenin quotes adduced in support of socialism on one country are taken out of context. They argue that in the 1915 article On the Slogan for a United States of Europe the expression "triumph of socialism [...] possible in [...] a single capitalist country" in context refers only to the initial establishment of a proletarian political and economic regime and not to the eventual construction of a complete socialist society which would take generations. As for the quote from the 1923 article On Cooperation, Trotsky maintains that the passage speaking of "necessary and sufficient" prerequisites for the transition to socialism is concerned only with the "socio-organisational" and political prerequisites, but not with the "material-productive" and cultural ones which Russia still lacked.

Joseph Stalin 

Stalin presented the theory of socialism in one country as a further development of Leninism based on Lenin's aforementioned quotations. In his 14 February 1938 article titled Response to Comrade Ivanov, formulated as an answer to a question of a "comrade Ivanov" mailed to Pravda newspaper, Stalin splits the question in two parts. The first side of the question is in terms of the internal relations within the Soviet Union, whether it is possible to construct the socialist society by defeating the local bourgeoisie and fostering the union of workers and peasants. 

Stalin quotes Lenin that "we have all that is necessary for the building of a complete socialist society" and claims that the socialist society has for the most part been indeed constructed. The second side of the question is in terms of external relations and whether the victory of the socialism is "final", i.e. whether capitalism cannot possibly be restored. Here, Stalin cites Lenin that the final victory is possible only on the international scale and only with the help of the workers of other countries.

Marxist writer Isaac Deutscher traces Stalin's socialism in one country policy to the publication of The Foundations of Leninism which emphasized the policy of isolationism and economic development in opposition to Trotsky's policy of permanent revolution.

Karl Marx and Friedrich Engels 
Opponents of socialism in one country point out that on the question of socialist construction in a single country, Friedrich Engels wrote that:

Per contra, exponents of socialism in one country point out that Marx and Engels in 1848 in their Communist Manifesto wrote that:

Furthermore, they also point out that in 1882, Marx and Engels wrote that:

In popular culture 
The slogan was parodied in the novel Moscow 2042, where communism in one city was built.

See also 
 Leon Trotsky and the Politics of Economic Isolation
 Marxism–Leninism

References

Further reading

Primary sources

External links 
 
 
 

Left-wing nationalism
Ideology of the Communist Party of the Soviet Union
Joseph Stalin
Marxism–Leninism
Stalinism